İncili can refer to:

 İncili, Aydıntepe
 İncili Çavuş
 İncili, Çermik